La Libertad Canton is a canton of Ecuador, located in the Santa Elena Province.  Its capital is the town of La Libertad.  Its population at the 2001 census was 77,646.

Demographics
Ethnic groups as of the Ecuadorian census of 2010:
Mestizo  77.0%
Afro-Ecuadorian  10.2%
Montubio  5.1%
White  4.5%
Indigenous  1.2%
Other  2.0%

References

Cantons of Santa Elena Province